Arzanaq is a village in Pain Barzand Rural District, Anguti District, Germi County, Ardabil Province, Iran. At the 2006 census, its population was 188, in 42 families.

The time zone used in Arzanaq is Iran Standard Time, which is GMT + 3:30.

References 

Towns and villages in Germi County